Appila (earlier known as Yarrowie) is a locality in the Mid North of South Australia east of the lower Flinders Ranges. It occupies much of the eastern half of the Hundred of Appila and a strip on the western side of the adjacent Hundred of Tarcowie.

History
The town of Yarrowie (an Aboriginal word for hunting ground) was established in 1872 following the proclamation of the Strangways Land Act for closer settlement in 1869. The town grew quickly as settlers moved to the area, and by the 1880s it had two hotels, four blacksmiths, three carpenters, Protestant, Catholic and government schools, a post office and telegraph station as well as other stores. In 1877 the name was changed to Appila-Yarrowie then later to just Appila to remove confusion with other towns including Yarcowie, Tarcowie, Terowie, Caltowie and Willowie.

When the Lutheran school was closed by the state government in 1918, it had 33 students.

See also 
List of cities and towns in South Australia

References 

Towns in South Australia
Mid North (South Australia)